Northern may refer to the following:

Geography
 North, a point in direction
 Northern Europe, the northern part or region of Europe
 Northern Highland, a region of Wisconsin, United States
 Northern Province, Sri Lanka
 Northern Range, a range of hills in Trinidad

Schools
 Northern Collegiate Institute and Vocational School (NCIVS), a school in Sarnia, Canada
 Northern Secondary School, Toronto, Canada
 Northern Secondary School (Sturgeon Falls), Ontario, Canada
 Northern University (disambiguation), various institutions
 Northern Guilford High School, a public high school in Greensboro, North Carolina

Companies
 Arriva Rail North, a former train operating company in northern England
 Chemins de fer du Nord (Northern Railway Company), a former rail transport company in northern France
 Northern Bank, commercial bank in Northern Ireland
 Northern Foods, based in Leeds, England
 Northern Pictures, an Australian-based television production company
 Northern Rail, a former train operating company in northern England
 Northern Railway of Canada, a defunct railway in Ontario
 Northern Records, a Southern California independent record label
 Northern Store, a food and general merchandise store owned and operated by The North West Company
 Northern Trains, a train operating company in northern England
 Northern Trust, an international financial services company based in Chicago, Illinois

Transport
 Northern (automobile), an early American car
 Northern line, a part of the London Underground network
 Northern locomotive, a type of (4-8-4) steam locomotive

Other uses
 Bradford Northern, former name of the Bradford Bulls, a British rugby league football club
 Northern (Australian film genre), a sub-genre of the Australian Western
 Northern (genre), a genre of Western films set in Canada or Alaska
 Northern AFC, an association football club based in Dunedin, New Zealand
 Northern (contituency), various districts
 Northern Hotel, a historic hotel in Billings, Montana
 Northern Hotel (Nevada), a former hotel in Ely, Nevada
 Northern pike, fish often called a "northern"

See also
 
 
 
 
 Nord (disambiguation)
 Nordicity, degree of Northernness
 Norte (disambiguation)
 North (disambiguation)
 Severny (disambiguation)